Madagascar Exotic (also known as the Peyrieras Butterfly Farm, Peyrieras Nature Farm and Mandraka Reptile Farm) is a small privately run reserve (or zoo) at Marozevo, on National Road N2,  east of Antananarivo, between the towns of Manjakandriana and Moramanga.  It is a popular tourist stop between Antananarivo and Madagascar's Andasibe-Mantadia National Park.

It was founded and owned by the French entomologist and naturalist André Peyriéras,

 which is why it is also known as the Reserve Peyrieras.

The collection includes many reptiles (chameleons, iguanas, geckos, frogs), batraciens (amphibians), crocodiles and papillons (butterflies).  The adjacent forest area supports families of relocated and habituated Verreaux's sifaka and common brown lemur which provide opportunities to photograph them close up at feeding times.

Most of the reptiles and other species are held within several large caged buildings and greenhouses, which tourists may enter when accompanied by a guide. A group of Coquerel's sifaka return daily to be fed and to aid photography by the tourists.

Species List
This list will inevitably be incomplete. Please help by expanding the list.
The following species have been listed and/or photographed at this reserve:

 Chameleons
 Horned leaf chameleon (Brookesia superciliaris) 
 Jewelled chameleons spp. (Furcifer lateralis) 
 Lance-nosed chameleon (Calumma gallus)
 Leaf chameleon (Brookesia tristis) 
 Nose-horned chameleon (Calumma nasutum) ,
 Oustalet's chameleon (Furcifer oustaleti) ,
 Panther chameleon (Furcifer pardalis) ,
 Parson's chameleon (Calumma parsonii) 
 Perinet chameleon (Calumma gastrotaenia) 
 Pygmy leaf chameleon (Brookesia minima) 
 White-lined chameleon (Furcifer antimena) 
 Will's chameleon (Furcifer willsii)
 Calumma malthe
 Jewelled chameleon (Furcifer campani)
 Frogs
 Black-eared mantella (Mantella milotympanum) 
 Painted mantella (Mantella madagascariensis) 
 Golden mantella (Mantella aurantiaca)
 Tomato frog (Dyscophus antongilii) 
 Reptiles
 Bright skink (Trachylepis elegans) 
 Collared iguana (Oplurus cuvieri)
 Lined leaf-tailed gecko (Uroplatus lineatus) ,
 Madagascan house gecko (Hemidactylus frenatus) 
 Mossy leaf-tailed gecko (Uroplatus sikorae) ,
 Satanic (or giant) leaf-tailed gecko (Uroplatus fimbriatus) ,
 Spearpoint leaf-tailed gecko (Uroplatus ebenaui) ,
 Butterflies and moths
 African (or mocker) swallowtail butterfly (Papilio dardanus cenea) 
 Precis andremiaja
 Insects
 Broad scarlet dragonfly (Crocothemis erythraea) 
 Stick insects (Phasmatodea 
 Snakes
 Madagascar leaf-nosed snake (Langaha madagascariensis) ,
 Madagascar tree boa (Sanzinia madagascariensis) 
 Other
 Common tenrec (Tenrec ecaudatus) 
 Madagascan giant red (or fire) millipede (Aphistogoniulus) ,	
 Madagascan fruit bat (Eidolon dupreanum) 
 Nile crocodile (Crocodylus niloticus)

References

Zoos in Madagascar
Reptiles and humans
Chameleons
Endemic fauna of Madagascar
 Pey